Rainer Langhans (born June 19, 1940 in Oschersleben) is a German writer and filmmaker who is primarily known for his membership of Kommune 1.

References

External links 
 Blog of Rainer Langhans
 Elementarfragen, Episode 9, Interview with Rainer Langhans, Audiopodcast from Nicolas Semak, November 19, 2011
 *

1940 births
Living people
German male writers
Ich bin ein Star – Holt mich hier raus! participants